Kreba-Neudorf, Upper Sorbian: Chrjebja-Nowa Wjes, is a municipality in the district Görlitz, Saxony, Germany.

The municipality is part of the recognized Sorbian settlement area in Saxony. Upper Sorbian has an official status next to German, all villages bear names in both languages.

References 

Municipalities in Saxony
Populated places in Görlitz (district)